The 8th Presidium of the Workers' Party of Korea (WPK)(8차 조선로동당 상임위원회), officially the Presidium of the Political Bureau of the 8th Congress of the Workers' Party of Korea(제 8차 조선로동당 당대회 정치국 상임위원회), was elected by the 1st Plenary Session of the 8th Central Committee on 10 May 2021.

Members

References

Citations

Bibliography
Books:
 
 
  

Dissertations:
 

8th Presidium of the Workers' Party of Korea
2021 establishments in North Korea